Salza di Pinerolo (Vivaro-Alpine: Salsa, French: Salze-de-Pignerol) is a comune (municipality) in the Metropolitan City of Turin in the Italian region Piedmont, located about  southwest of Turin.

Salza di Pinerolo borders the following municipalities: Pragelato, Massello, Perrero, and Prali.

References

Cities and towns in Piedmont